Nina Morhunova (born 21 April 1951) is a Ukrainian middle-distance runner. She competed in the women's 800 metres at the 1972 Summer Olympics.

References

1951 births
Living people
Athletes (track and field) at the 1972 Summer Olympics
Ukrainian female middle-distance runners
Soviet female middle-distance runners
Olympic athletes of the Soviet Union
Place of birth missing (living people)